Stanislaw Padewski, O.F.M.Cap. (18 September 1932 – 29 January 2017) was a Roman Catholic bishop.

Ordained to the priesthood in 1957, Padewski served as auxiliary bishop for the Roman Catholic Diocese of Kamyanets-Podilskyi from 1995 to 1998 and for the Roman Catholic Archdiocese of Lviv, Ukraine from 1998 to 2002. He then served as bishop of the Roman Catholic Diocese of Kharkiv-Zaporizhia from 2002 to 2009.

Notes

1932 births
2017 deaths
20th-century Roman Catholic bishops in Ukraine
21st-century Roman Catholic bishops in Ukraine
Capuchin bishops